The Yomut or Yomud is a Turkmen tribe that lives in Western and Central Asia, including Gorgan, Iran; Turkmenbashi, Turkmenistan; the eastern Caspian shores; Khiva, Uzbekistan; and Dashoguz, Turkmenistan.

The Yomut carpet is a type of rug traditionally handwoven by the Yomut.

History 

Nadir Shah in 1740 sent a letter to the ruler of Khiva, Ilbars Khan, asking him to come to ask for forgiveness. The envoys of Nadir Shah with a letter arrived at the Ilbars camp, which was headed by 20 thousand horsemen, consisting of Yomuts, (other) Turkmens, Kazakhs and Uzbeks. The letter said: "Several times with the predatory tribe of Yomuts for the purpose of robbery, you raided the vicinity of sacred Mashhad and each time experienced misfortune and, having suffered defeat, defeated, went (back) to Khiva. Despite my peacefulness, three thousand people from the Yomut tribes, with the aim of making a night raid, arrived in Chardjuy. Upon learning of this, the troops of (Nadir Shah) destroyed them in one blow and scattered them like the stars of the Big Dipper. Most of them were killed and taken prisoner, and (only) a small number with a thousand disasters made it to safety.

It is said that at the end of the reign of Shahgazi Khan (c. 1181 x. - 1767) the Yomuts and Choudors captured Khiva. As a result of attempts at resistance, the khan was overthrown from the throne.

In the same year, some of the dignitaries, hostile towards Muhammad Emin-inak, began to fight against him. For this reason, the inak went to the yomuts, (but) after 18 days Abd-us-Sattar-bai was brought from there. At this time, the dominance of the Yomuts already crossed all borders, and their cruelty and oppression burdened the population to the extreme (fukara).

As a result, Muhammad Emin-inak, Abd-us-Sattar-bai and Abd-ur-Ra-khim-mekhter opposed the Yomuts, but were defeated in the battle of Arab-khane. Pursuing them, the Yomuts stopped at Kara-Tepe and began to prepare for a siege. Some (from the Khivans) began to talk about peace; when the dignitaries (umara) came out and met with the chiefs of the yomuts, they were seized, and at the same time, the yomuts, taking advantage of the fact that the city dwellers were persecuting the teke and the salyrs, seized the city of Khiva .

The Yomuts, with the help of the Aral people, conquered Kungrad, (after which) the power was in their hands.

They put Khan Geldy-inak at the head of the power, who was an adherent and well-wisher of this (Turkmen) tribe, and they did not reckon with other dignitaries, starting with Muhammad Emin, and even treated them with contempt. Themselves at this time began to rob the people, stealing their property and women and insulting him in every possible way.

In 1770, Muhammad Amin-biy, the leader of the Uzbek tribe of Kungrats, defeated the Yomuds and established his power in the khanate.

In 1779, by order of Mohammed Emin-inak, an army of Yomuts, who belonged to the Khorasan and Gurgan Turkmens, came to the outskirts of Khiva. Let it be known that these Yomuts belonged to two different clans (taif): some were called bairam-shahli, and others - choni-sheref, also known under the nickname kara-choka. Mohammed Emin-inak accepted them for service. After that, both of these troops went to war with his enemies.

During the reign of the son and successor of the inak Evez-biy (died March 13, 1804), the Yomuts, apparently, were not in openly hostile relations with him, judging by the fact that he fled to their territory in 1206. (1791 | 92) Pahlavan Quli Bai was extradited by them to the Inak, due to the fact that they "were afraid of his anger and severity."

After the death of Evez-biy in 1219 h. (1804/05) power in Khiva passed to his son Eltuzer, who soon declared himself khan. From all over the country, the tribes of Turkmens, Kara-Kalpaks and Uzbeks came in whole detachments to congratulate him, but the Yomuts, who, having lived in Urgench for 60 years, did not obey the Khiva khans, laughed at Eltuzer Khan and showed disobedience.

Eltuzer Khan, after ascending to the khan's throne, gave out support to the troops and went to pogrom the Yomuts who lived on the edge of the desert towards Astrabad - the territory of Iran and Gürgen, located south of the city of Khiva. Some of them lived sedentary, while most were nomads. There were approximately 12 thousand families (at the beginning of the 19th century). Each family has two riders, they have thoroughbred horses and are good at pike and saber. So, this tribe was divided into two parts. Some decided to obey, saying: "We cannot leave the homeland of our ancestors and how can we live in a foreign country!" Some of them refused to obey because Eltuzer Khan suggested to them: "If you give up your raids, disobedience and robberies and live like other subjects, paying taxes from sheep, camels and agriculture, then it's good, otherwise, leave our state. " After some time Eltuzer Khan sent a messenger to the yomuts in Astrabad with oaths and assurances to say: "Together with your families and kin, return to the homeland of your ancestors, we will show you affection and love, you will participate in the use of our wealth." Yomuts joyful and cheerful began to return. Eltuzer Khan again handed them their former possessions, so that they could start farming.

After Eltuzer Khan in 1221, H. (1806) power passed into the hands of Mohammed Rahim Khan, to whom the Yomuts also obeyed.

The Yomuds raided the Astrabad and Mazandaran provinces of Persia and Khorasan to kidnap local residents, whom they then sold into slavery, mainly to the Khiva Khanate.
.

In 1877, some of the leaders of the Yomuds, in connection with the enmity with the Tekins, asked to accept Russian citizenship, but they were then refused. The Yomuds became Russian subjects in 1881-84 
.

In the spring of 1918, the leader of the Turkmen Yomuds, Dzhunaid Khan, seized power in Khiva. In November 1919, a communist-led uprising began. However, the forces of the rebels were not enough to defeat the government forces. Troops of the Red Army from Russia were sent to the aid of the rebels . By the beginning of February 1920, the army of Dzhunaid Khan was completely defeated.

Culture

Yomut carpets are famous.

Horse breeding
The tribe also supported a special local Yomud breed, just like the Akhal-Teke , is a descendant of ancient horses. It is bred in the southwestern part of Turkmenistan and the mountainous regions bordering with Iran in conditions of herd keeping. By type, Yomud horses approach the steppe ones, they are rougher than Akhal-Teke horses. Being a riding horse in addition and main use, Yomuds are now used in harness. In endurance they surpass the Akhal-Teke horses, yielding to the latter in agility at a gallop.

References 

Ethnic Turkmen people
Ethnic groups in Turkmenistan
Turkmen tribes